Kenneth Perera (18 August 1934 - 26 August 2013) is a Malaysian sprinter. He competed in the men's 400 metres at the 1956 Summer Olympics.

References

External links
 

1934 births
2013 deaths
Living people
Athletes (track and field) at the 1956 Summer Olympics
Malaysian male sprinters
Malaysian male middle-distance runners
Olympic athletes of Malaya
Place of birth missing (living people)